"The Disappointed" (also typeset as "The Diſappointed") is a song written by Andy Partridge of the English rock band XTC and released as the lead single from their 1992 album, Nonsuch. According to Partridge: the lyrics are about people who have been turned down romantically and come together to form an organisation "of the disappointed." It was originally inspired by Argentina's Mothers of the Disappeared. The music video was directed by a relative of Ranulph Fiennes. A home demo of the song was later released on Coat of Many Cupboards (2002).

Reception
Colin Larkin says the song, "could just as easily have acted as a personal epitaph." The Rough Guide describes the song as, "soaringly melodic." The single reached  33 on the UK Singles Chart, No. 32 on the Australian ARIA Singles Chart, and No. 68 on the Dutch Single Top 100. In 1993, the song was nominated for an Ivor Novello Award.

Charts

References

External links
 

1992 singles
1992 songs
Song recordings produced by Gus Dudgeon
Songs written by Andy Partridge
Virgin Records singles
XTC songs